A swamper in occupational slang is an assistant worker, helper, maintenance person, or someone who performs odd jobs.  The term has its origins circa 1857 in the southern United States to refer to a workman who cleared roads for a timber faller in a swamp, according to the Oxford English Dictionary.  It has since branched out into a variety of meanings, all of which denote some variation on an unskilled laborer working as an assistant to a skilled worker.

Examples of usage
 In the trucking industry (primarily moving & storage) in Canada, a truck driver's assistant who performs a variety of tasks as a helper under supervision of the operator but does not drive. 
 A laborer in the moving industry. Most work consists of loading and unloading packed boxes, furniture and other objects.
 In logging, somebody who clears brush, clears paths for logs to be transported to the landing, or limbs felled trees before they are bucked.
 In the restaurant industry, a kitchen assistant to the chef.  Also, somebody who cleans up after closing of a restaurant, bar, or nightclub.
 In the United States Forest Service, a firefighter in charge of the maintenance of tools and equipment; also used to refer to the assistant to a sawyer who clears brush as the sawyer cuts it.
 In commercial river outfitting, an assistant to the main pilot of the boat, who helps with cooking and setup and takedown of campsites.
 A laborer in the oil and gas transportation services. Jobs in the oil rig mobilization sector use specialized heavy-haul vehicles to transport oil rigs, equipment, liquid and gas products, and other supplies used in the exploration, development and production of oil and natural gas resources.  Workers in such jobs take part in pre-job planning, equipment preparation, loading, dismantling, unloading and erecting of oil rigs and field equipment and post-job operations.

See also
  Gofer

References

Cleaning and maintenance occupations
Forestry occupations
Hospitality occupations
Transport occupations